Kashinath Rao Vaidya (died 13 March 1959, Hyderabad) was an Indian lawyer and politician. Vaidya was elected to the Hyderabad State Legislative Assembly in the 1952 election as the Indian National Congress candidate from the Begum Bazar constituency. Vaidya obtained 15,794 votes (72.48% of the votes in the constituency). Following the election, he was elected speaker of the Assembly.

Vaidya died in Hyderabad on 13 March 1959.

References

Indian National Congress politicians from Andhra Pradesh
1959 deaths
Year of birth missing
Hyderabad State politicians
Politicians from Hyderabad, India